William Phillip Connell (August 24, 1874 – February 13, 1932) was a college football player and later a prominent business man of Baton Rouge, Louisiana.

Vanderbilt University
He was a running back for the Vanderbilt Commodores football team of Vanderbilt University. Considered one of the sport's early greats, he was picked for an all-time Vanderbilt team in 1912. Connell was captain of the 1895 and 1896 teams.

1892
The oldest team in the memory of Grantland Rice was the 1892 team. Rice claimed Connell then would be a good player in any era.

1894
Connel featured in Vanderbilt's first ever defeat of Ole Miss in 1894, giving the school its only loss of the season by the score of 40 to 0.

1895
Connell was selected as a substitute for the All-Southern team.

1897
He and captain Howard Boogher dove to recover the ball after the victory in the school's rivalry game with Sewanee in 1897. Vanderbilt allowed no points on the season and split a claim to the championship of the south when it held Virginia to a scoreless tie. Casper Whitney said he was the South's finest football player.

Connell won Bachelor of Ugliness.

References

External links

Vanderbilt Commodores football players
American football fullbacks
19th-century players of American football
American football halfbacks
1874 births
Players of American football from Nashville, Tennessee
1932 deaths
People from Baton Rouge, Louisiana
American football drop kickers